Jahri Divine Evans (born August 22, 1983) is an American former football guard who played in the National Football League (NFL). He played college football at Bloomsburg. Evans was drafted by the New Orleans Saints in the fourth round of the 2006 NFL Draft and won Super Bowl XLIV with the team over the Indianapolis Colts. He has also been a member of the Seattle Seahawks and Green Bay Packers.

Although only a fourth round draft pick from a small school, Evans established a reputation as one of the best guards in the NFL, and in May 2010 the Saints signed him to a contract that made him the highest-paid guard in NFL history at the time.

High school career
Unusual for an NFL player, Evans did not play football until high school. He attended Frankford High School in Philadelphia, Pennsylvania, where he was an All-Public League selection as a junior. However, Evans fractured his leg playing a game of pickup basketball at a church event prior to his senior year and missed the entire football season. While sidelined he focused on academics, graduating 10th in his class, and with the help of his high school coach, Tom Mullineaux, was admitted to Bloomsburg University of Pennsylvania. In fact, Evans did not attend Bloomsburg on an athletic scholarship, but rather an academic scholarship.

College career
Evans attended Bloomsburg University of Pennsylvania, where he played for the Bloomsburg Huskies football team.  After redshirting his first year, he spent his freshman season as a reserve offensive lineman. By his sophomore year, he took over as the starter at left tackle and went on to anchor the Huskies offensive line for the following three seasons. He was awarded All-Pennsylvania State Athletic Conference honors in each of those seasons, while earning Division II "Little All-American" selections in his junior and senior years.

As a junior, Evans had 88 knockdowns with 10 blocks resulting in a touchdown. In his senior season, he opened holes for fellow Little All-America selection Jamar Brittingham, who ran for 2,260 yards and 32 touchdowns. He was a finalist for the Division II Gene Upshaw Offensive Player of the Year Award in each of final two seasons.

Professional career
Entering the 2006 NFL Draft, Evans was seen as a developmental prospect and was projected to move from tackle to guard in the NFL. He was evaluated as an early seventh round pick by Sports Illustrated.

New Orleans Saints
Evans was selected in the fourth round (108th overall) by the Saints, after they had traded their early fourth-round pick in the draft to the Philadelphia Eagles for veteran defensive tackle Hollis Thomas and the Eagles' mid-fourth-round pick. Evans was the first Bloomsburg player drafted since Eric Jonassen went 140th overall to the San Diego Chargers in the 1992 NFL Draft. Evans was signed to a three-year contract by the Saints on July 25, 2006. He emerged as a consistent performer in training camp and preseason, and won the starting job after the projected starter, Jermane Mayberry, was injured in training camp and ultimately retired.  In his rookie year, Evans started all 16 games, and both playoff games, at right guard.  He was subsequently named to the Pro Football Weekly All-Rookie team.

In his second year, Evans started all 16 games at right guard again, and contributed to an offense that ranked No. 3 overall in the NFL.

Jake Kupp made the Pro Bowl in 1969, Brad Edelman was honored in 1987, and LeCharles Bentley went in 2003.

Evans was a restricted free agent after the 2009 season, and on May 11, 2010, the Saints resigned Evans to a seven-year, $56.7 million contract that was reported to make Evans the highest-paid interior offensive lineman in NFL history, surpassing Alan Faneca's five-year, $40 million deal with the New York Jets in 2008.

On February 8, 2016, the Saints released Evans.

Seattle Seahawks
On August 6, 2016, Evans signed a one-year deal with the Seattle Seahawks. He was released on September 2, at the end of the preseason.

New Orleans Saints (second stint)
On September 7, 2016, Evans returned to the Saints, signing a one-year deal. Also in 2016, Evans was named to the Saints All-50th Team. In Week 8 of the 2016 season, Evans helped pave the way for running backs Tim Hightower and Mark Ingram II as the pair ran for a combined 245 yards and two touchdowns. Evans also helped the two backs again at home against the Los Angeles Rams in Week 11, rushing for a combined 197 yards and one touchdown. Evans was also important in the success of a 21-yard screen pass from quarterback Drew Brees to Ingram, resulting in a touchdown that same week.

Green Bay Packers
On April 26, 2017, Evans signed with the Green Bay Packers. He started 14 games at right guard for the Packers in 2017.

Coaching career
Evans served as a preseason coaching intern in 2022 with the New Orleans Saints as part of the NFL's minority coach internship program.

Personal life
Evans graduated from Bloomsburg in May 2007 with a bachelor's degree in exercise science. In 2009, he established a full scholarship for out-of-state minority students enrolled in BU's Master of Science in clinical athletic training program.  He is a member of the Omega Psi Phi fraternity.

In 2013, Evans married his girlfriend, Takia, in the Bahamas.

In August 2015, Evans bought a share of the Philadelphia Soul of the Arena Football League, joining his Saints teammate Marques Colston, who had bought a piece of the team in 2014. He is currently serving as a preseason coaching intern with the New Orleans Saints as part of the NFL's minority coach internship program.

References

External links
The Jahri Evans Foundation
New Orleans Saints bio
Green Bay Packers bio

1983 births
Living people
American football offensive guards
Bloomsburg Huskies football players
Green Bay Packers players
National Conference Pro Bowl players
New Orleans Saints players
Players of American football from Philadelphia
Seattle Seahawks players
Unconferenced Pro Bowl players